= Sprinze Helfft Levy =

Prussian banker

Sprinze Helfft Levy (1735–1804), was a Prussian banker.

Levy took over the position of hoffaktoren or banker of the King of Prussia from her husband Salomon Moses Levy (Shlomo Chalfan) in 1775–1790.
